Pakistan's native flora reflects its varied climatic zones, which range from arid and semi-arid to temperate and tropical.

For further details of habitats, see Ecoregions of Pakistan, Forestry in Pakistan and Wildlife of Pakistan.

Distribution

Northern highlands and valleys

Pakistan has conifer forests in most of the northern and north-western highlands. These occur from 1,000 to 4,000 m altitudes. Swat, Upper Dir, Lower Dir, Malakand, Mansehra and Abbottabad districts of Khyber Pakhtunkhwa (formerly North-West Frontier Province) are the main areas covered with coniferous forests. Pindrow fir (Abies pindrow) and Morinda spruce (Picea smithiana) occupy the highest altitudes, deodar (Cedrus deodara) and blue pine (Pinus wallichiana), the intermediate heights, and chir pine (Pinus roxburghii), occupy the lower areas.

Eastern plains and deserts

In most of Punjab and Sindh, the Indus plains have many fluvial landforms that support various natural biomes including tropical and subtropical dry and moist broadleaf forestry as well as tropical and xeric shrublands (deserts of Thal in Punjab, Tharparkar in Sindh) and kair (Capparis aphylla) which provide firewood. The riparian woodlands grow in narrow belts along the banks of River Indus and its tributaries. Main tree varieties are of sheesham and babul and main shrub varieties are reed beds and tamarisk (Tamarax dioica) bushes.

Wetlands and coastal regions

In the south of Sindh are Indus River Delta in west and Great Rann of Kutch in east. The largest saltwater wetland in Pakistan is the Indus River Delta. Unlike many other river deltas, it consists of clay soil and is very swampy. The Great Rann of Kutch below the Thar Desert is not as swampy and exhibits shrubland vegetation of rather dry thorny shrubs as well as marsh grasses of Apluda and Cenchrus. Other saltwater wetlands are located on the coast of Balochistan such as at Sonmiani and Jiwani. These and Indus River Delta support mangrove forestry, mainly of species Avicennia marina.

See also
Ecoregions of Pakistan
Wildlife of Pakistan
Forestry in Pakistan
Fauna of Pakistan
Trees of Pakistan
Wildflowers of Pakistan
List of botanical gardens in Pakistan

External links

Missouri Botanical Garden - Inventory of the Plants of Pakistan
efloras.org - Flora of Pakistan
Lahore Gardening Blog - Encyclopaedia of flowers
Pakistan Plant Database (PPD)
PARC Databases by Pakistan Agricultural Research Council